The discography of Rednex, a Swedish dance group, consists of three studio albums, two compilation albums, one extended plays, 18 singles, including one as featured artist, 9 promotional singles, and 17 music videos, including one as featured artist. The first Rednex release was the debut studio album Sex & Violins in 1995, preceded by the massive chart hits "Cotton Eye Joe", a cover version, and "Old Pop in an Oak", both released in 1994. This success was followed with the sophomore release Farm Out in 2000, including the hit single "The Spirit of the Hawk". The album Best of the West, their first compilation album, followed in 2002. In 2012, a studio album titled Saturday Night Beaver was planned, but remains shelved.

Albums

Studio albums

Unreleased albums

Compilation albums

Extended plays

Singles

Featured singles

Promotional singles

Music videos

Featured music videos

Notes

References

Discographies of Swedish artists